Year Long Disaster is the self-titled debut studio album by American hard rock band Year Long Disaster. Recorded at Waterworks Recording West in Tucson, Arizona with producer James J. Waters, it was released on August 21, 2007 by Volcom Entertainment. "Leda Atomica/It Ain't Luck" and "Per Qualche Dollaro in Piu" were released as singles.

Recording and production
Year Long Disaster was recorded at producer James J. Waters' studio Waterworks Recording West in Tucson, Arizona, mixed by Brian Scheuble at The Village in Los Angeles, California, and mastered by Dave Cheppa at Better Quality Sound in Los Angeles. In addition to the band's lineup of Daniel Davies on vocals and guitar, Rich Mullins on bass, and Brad Hargreaves on drums and percussion, the album also features Joey Burns (of Tucson-based band Calexico) on cello and double bass, and Vicki Brown on viola and violin.

Reception

Media response to Year Long Disaster was mixed. Rick Anderson of AllMusic awarded the album three out of five stars, suggesting that while the band's sound is derivative of their influences (including Led Zeppelin, Cream and Black Sabbath), they "deserve credit for embracing their influences without shame".

Track listing

Personnel

Year Long Disaster
Daniel Davies – vocals, guitar
Rich Mullins – bass
Brad Hargreaves – drums, percussion
Production personnel
James J. Waters – producer, engineer
Brian Scheuble – mixing
Dave Cheppa – mastering

Additional musicians
Joey Burns – cello, double bass
Vicki Brown – viola, violin
Artwork personnel
Carl Bartoles – art direction, design
Kirsten CoConis – art direction
Ted CoConis – cover artwork
Stephen Albanese – photography

References

2007 debut albums
Year Long Disaster albums
Volcom Entertainment albums